Paracomp was a Macintosh programming company known for their 3D software, Swivel 3D and ModelShop and FilmMaker. FilmMaker was known for its packaging which was a 16mm film reel tin which was used to contain the software and manuals. Paracomp was also the publisher of the computer algebra system Milo, which was the first program on Macintosh able to perform symbolic computation using standard math notation. Paracomp was acquired by MacroMind in 1991 to briefly form MacroMind-Paracomp, before adding Authorware in 1992 and becoming Macromedia.

References

Software companies based in the San Francisco Bay Area
Defunct software companies of the United States